Richard Hansen Franchot (June 2, 1816 – November 23, 1875) was a U.S. Representative from New York and then an officer in the Union Army during the American Civil War. He was also an executive of two railroad companies, Albany and Susquehanna Railroad and Central Pacific Railroad.

Biography
Franchot was born in the town of Morris, Otsego County, New York, the son of French immigrant Paschal Franchot. He attended the public schools and the Hartwick and Cherry Valley Academies. He studied civil engineering at Rensselaer Polytechnic Institute, in Troy, New York. He served for several years as president of the Albany and Susquehanna Railroad.

Franchot was elected as a Republican to the Thirty-seventh Congress (March 4, 1861 – March 3, 1863). He was not a candidate for renomination in 1862.

He moved to Schenectady, New York, and raised the 121st New York Infantry. Franchot was commissioned as a colonel on August 23, 1862, and was brevetted as a brigadier general of U.S. Volunteers dating from March 13, 1865.

After the war, he was associated with the Central Pacific Railroad.

Franchot died in Schenectady on November 23, 1875. He was interred in Vale Cemetery.

Family
New York Superintendent of Public Works Nicholas Van Vranken Franchot (1855–1943) and State Senator Stanislaus P. Franchot (1851–1908) were his sons, Assemblyman Nicholas V. V. Franchot II (1884–1938) was his grandson, actor Franchot Tone (1905-1968) was his great-grandson, and former Maryland Comptroller Peter Franchot (1947–) is also his descendant.

References

External links
 Retrieved on 2008-11-01

Antietam: Colonel Richard Hansen Franchot
Family of Morris and Niagara Falls, New York

Further reading
Becker, Alfred LeRoy. The Ancestors of Nicholas Van Vranken Franchot (1941)

1816 births
1875 deaths
American people of French descent
Rensselaer Polytechnic Institute alumni
People of New York (state) in the American Civil War
Union Army generals
Politicians from Schenectady, New York
19th-century American railroad executives
Republican Party members of the United States House of Representatives from New York (state)
People from Morris, New York
19th-century American politicians